Negro Creek is a stream in Pennington County, South Dakota, in the United States.

Negro Creek was known as Nigger Creek until the name was changed in the 1960s. The creek was named for a black prospector who operated in the area.

See also
List of rivers of South Dakota

References

Rivers of Pennington County, South Dakota
Rivers of South Dakota